Saint-Goazec in commune in the Finistère department of Brittany in northwestern France.

Population
Inhabitants of Saint-Goazec are called in French Saint-Goaziens. The commune's population peaks in 1906.

Geography

Saint-Goazec lies on the northern slope of the Montagnes Noires (french, Black Mountains). The canal de Nantes à Brest, which is the canalized river Aulne, forms the commune's northern border.

Map

See also
Communes of the Finistère department
Listing of the works of the atelier of the Maître de Tronoën

References

External links

Official website 

Mayors of Finistère Association 

Communes of Finistère